Maximilian Siegfried Franz Dimitrovici (born February 22, 1989), aka Maximilian Dimitrovici, is a German ice hockey defenceman. Currently, he plays in the Turkish Ice Hockey Super League for Zeytinburnu BS.

Playing career
Dimitrovici began his ice hockey career appearing in the 2004–05 Jugend-BL, the youth level of German ice hockey, for the U18 team of ETC Crimmitschau. Then, he played for ESC Erfurt U20 (2005–2007 Junioren-BL), EHC Thüringen U20 (2007–2010 Junioren-BL) and Black Dragons Erfurt (2010–2014 Germany 3). In the 2014–15 season, he moved to Turkey to play for the Istanbul-based team Zeytinburnu BS in the Turkish Ice Hockey Super League. After one season, he returned to his former club Black Dragons Erfurt in her hometown. For the 2016–17 season, he rejoined his team in Turkey.

References

Living people
1989 births
Sportspeople from Erfurt
German ice hockey defencemen
Zeytinburnu Belediyespor players
German expatriate sportspeople in Turkey
Expatriate ice hockey players in Turkey